Stephannie Ethiel Vásquez Coronel (born 24 June 1994) is a Peruvian footballer who plays as a right back for Club Universitario de Deportes and the Peru women's national team. She is also an international futsal player.

International career
Vásquez represented Peru at the 2010 South American U-17 Women's Championship. At senior level, she played the 2019 Pan American Games.

References

External links

1994 births
Living people
Women's association football fullbacks
Peruvian women's footballers
Footballers from Lima
Peru women's international footballers
Pan American Games competitors for Peru
Footballers at the 2019 Pan American Games
Club Universitario de Deportes footballers
Peruvian women's futsal players